Smiling Assassin is the debut solo album by Widespread Panic keyboardist John Hermann, released in 2001. Other members of Widespread Panic as well as members of the North Mississippi All Stars and Blue Mountain also perform on the album.

Track listing
All tracks written by John Hermann except where noted.

 "Hell for Horses" 2:43
 "Smiling Assassin" 4:08
 "Mountain Hideaway" 3:41
 "Abilene" 4:19
 "Don't Look Down" 3:56
 "Lazy Bum" 3:44
 "Run You Down" 3:18
 "Don't Throw It Away" 5:11
 "Swamp Tag" 2:43
 "Daisy Mae" 3:56
 "Lonely Avenue" (Doc Pomus) 5:09

Personnel

Musicians
 John Hermann – guitar, keyboards, vocals
 John Bell – vocals
 Michael Houser – guitar
 Todd Nance – 12 string guitar, shaker
 Domingo Ortiz – percussion
 George McConnell – guitar
 Luther Dickinson – guitar
 Cody Dickinson – drums
 Paul Edwards – bass
 Cary Hudson – harmonica, violin
 John Keane – shaker

Production
 John Hermann – producer
 Bruce Watson – producer, engineer
 John Keane – mixing
 Michael Iacopelli – mastering
 Steve Roberts – cover photo
 Brandon "Wundabred" Seavers – design, layout design

References

External links
 Smiling Assassin on AllMusic

2001 albums
Fat Possum Records albums